The spotted quail-thrush (Cinclosoma punctatum) is a species of bird in the family Cinclosomatidae.
It is endemic to Australia.

Its natural habitat is subtropical, tropical and temperate dry forest.

References

spotted quail-thrush
Birds of Queensland
Birds of New South Wales
Birds of Victoria (Australia)
Birds of Tasmania
Endemic birds of Australia
spotted quail-thrush
Taxonomy articles created by Polbot
Taxa named by George Shaw